Hans Jordi (born 1929) is a Swiss former footballer who played in the late 1940s and 1950s. He played mainly as a forward.

Jordi first played for Nordstern Basel. He joined FC Basel's first team for their 1954–55 season under player-coach René Bader. Jordi only played one season for the club. He made his domestic league debut for the club in the away game on 19 December 1954 as Basel drew 1–1 with Lausanne-Sport.

During his season with the club Jordi played seven games for Basel scoring one goal. Three games were in the Nationalliga A, one in the Swiss Cup and three were friendly games. He scored his sole goal during the test games.

Following his time with FC Basel Jordi moved on to play for Concordia Basel, who at that time played in the second tier in Swiss football.

References

Sources
 Die ersten 125 Jahre. Publisher: Josef Zindel im Friedrich Reinhardt Verlag, Basel. 
 Verein "Basler Fussballarchiv" Homepage

FC Basel players
FC Nordstern Basel players
FC Concordia Basel players
Swiss men's footballers
Association football forwards
1929 births
Living people